This list of mills in Stockport, lists textile factories that have existed in Stockport, Greater Manchester, England.

From the Industrial Revolution until the 20th century, Stockport was a major centre of textile manufacture, particularly cotton spinning and hat making. During this period, the valleys of the River Mersey, River Tame and their tributaries were dominated by large rectangular brick-built factories, many of which still remain today as warehouses or converted for residential or retail use.

Standing mills in Stockport

Other mills

References

Notes

Bibliography

External links

Grace's Guides: 1891 Worrall's Directory
Helen Clapcott paintings of Stockport

 01
Stockport
Stockport
Stockport
Buildings and structures in the Metropolitan Borough of Stockport
History of the textile industry
Industrial Revolution in England